HPMS may refer to:

 Harbour Pointe Middle School, in Mukilteo, Washington, United States
 Harrold Priory Middle School, in Bedfordshire, England
 High proper motion star

See also 
 HPM (disambiguation)